Electrodomésticos (Spanish for Appliances) is a Chilean band of experimental rock and electronic rock, formed in Santiago de Chile in 1984. The band was one of the most critically acclaimed avant-garde acts of the underground scene of Pinochet´s Chile during the 1980s. They were active from 1984 to 1991, when they produced two remarkable albums, Viva Chile and Carrera de éxitos. They reunited in 2002 and created a new album called La Nueva Canción Chilena. They dissolved again in 2005, and reunited again in 2011, when a documentary about them was made by Sergio Castro, called Electrodomésticos: El frío misterio. Carlos Cabezas was the founding member and leader of the emblematic band. In 2017 they released a new studio album called Ex la humanidad.

Discography 
1986 - ¡Viva Chile!
1987 - Carreras De Éxitos
2004 - La Nueva Canción Chilena
2013 - Se Caiga El Cielo
2014 - El Calor (EP)
2017 - Ex la humanidad

Chilean rock music groups
Rock en Español music groups
Musical groups established in 1984